Jean Faure (14 January 1937 – 13 May 2022) was a French politician who served as member of the Senate of France. He represented the Isère department and was a member of the Union for a Popular Movement Party. He served in French Army in Algeria during the Algerian War from 1957 to 1958.

References

Page on the Senate website

1937 births
2022 deaths
Union for French Democracy politicians
Union for a Popular Movement politicians
French Senators of the Fifth Republic
Vice-presidents of the Senate (France)
French military personnel of the Algerian War
Senators of Isère